is a Jōdo Shinshū temple in Akkeshi, Hokkaidō, Japan.

See also
 Pure Land Buddhism

References

Buddhist temples in Hokkaido
Religious organizations established in 1879
Important Cultural Properties of Japan
Religious buildings and structures completed in 1799
Jōdo Shin temples